Infectious hypodermal and hematopoietic necrosis (IHHN) is a viral disease of penaeid shrimp that causes mass mortality (up to 90%) among the Western blue shrimp (Penaeus stylirostris) and severe deformations in the Pacific white shrimp (P. vannamei). It occurs in Pacific farmed and wild shrimp, but not in wild shrimp on the Atlantic coast of the Americas. The shrimp-farming industry has developed several broodstocks of both P. stylirostris and P. vannamei that are resistant against IHHN infection.

The disease is caused by a single-stranded DNA virus of the species Decapod pestylhamaparvovirus 1, earlier known as IHHN virus, the smallest of the known penaeid shrimp viruses (22 nm).

Virology
This virus has been classified as Penaeus stylirostris hamaparvovirus. The genome is 4.1 kilobases in length. There are three open reading frames in its genome:  a left non structural protein (NS1) of 2001 base pairs (bp), a mid non structural protein (NS2) of 1092 bp and a right capsid protein of 990 bp. NSI appears to be a DNA helicase with ATPase activity.

The mutation rate in the genome has been estimated to be ~1.4 x 10−4 substitutions/site/year. This is considerably higher than the rate in the double stranded DNA viruses and similar to that found in RNA viruses. It is also similar to the rate found in other single stranded DNA viruses.

References

External links

Viral zone 

Penaeidae
Animal viral diseases
Diseases and parasites of crustaceans